Richard Raymond Radatz (April 2, 1937 – March 16, 2005) was an American relief pitcher in Major League Baseball. He got his nickname by striking out several New York Yankees in a row at a game in Fenway Park in 1963.

Early years
Born in Detroit, Radatz attended Berkley High School. He was a star basketball and baseball player at Michigan State University before signing with the Red Sox as an amateur free agent in 1959. Originally a starting pitcher when he began his professional career, Radatz compiled a 16–10 record and 3.48 earned run average in his first two seasons in the Red Sox farm system.

A sore arm led Seattle Rainiers manager Johnny Pesky to convert him into a reliever in 1961 against Radatz's will. The experiment worked, as Radatz earned a job out of spring training the following season as a non-roster invitee.

Sporting News "Fireman of the Year"
Radatz was immediately dominant at the major league level, as he pitched 18.1 innings and recorded six saves before surrendering his first earned run on May 15, 1962 against the Yankees (a game which the Red Sox won, and Radatz earned his seventh save). He went on to lead the American League in saves (24), games (62) and relief wins (9), while posting a 2.24 ERA in 124.2 innings his rookie season, earning the AL's Fireman of the Year by The Sporting News.

Yankee manager Ralph Houk, who said, "For two seasons, I've never seen a better pitcher," added Radatz to his 1963 AL All-Star squad after a 33 scoreless inning streak saw his ERA dip to 0.88 on June 14. He gave up one earned run in two innings pitched, but impressed with strikeouts of Willie Mays, Dick Groat, Duke Snider, Willie McCovey and Julián Javier. For the season, he saved 23 games and went 15–6 with a 1.97 ERA, becoming the first pitcher in history to have consecutive 20-save seasons and finishing fifth in MVP voting despite Boston's seventh-place finish.

The Red Sox toyed with the idea of converting Radatz back into a starter for the 1964 season. Instead, he remained in the bullpen, and earned his second Fireman of the Year award in 1964 for his league-leading 29 saves with 16 wins and a 2.29 ERA in 79 games. Most notably, he fanned 181 batters in 157 innings, setting a record that still stands for most strikeouts by a relief pitcher in a single season. He was named to the AL's All-Star Game pitching staff again in 1964, and struck out the first two batters he faced when he entered the game in the eighth inning. He was, however, unable to hold onto the AL's 4–3 lead, as he surrendered four runs in the ninth, including a game ending three-run home run by Johnny Callison.

Boston Red Sox

Radatz got off to a poor start to the 1965 season, blowing three save opportunities and posting a 7.54 ERA through May 14. He settled down, bringing his ERA down to a far more respectable 3.91 and earning 22 saves by season's end, but his 9–11 mark was the first losing record he had posted in his major league career. Radatz's only career home run came off the Kansas City Athletics' Jesse Hickman on June 5, 1965. He was selected to the Boston Red Sox Hall of Fame in 1997.

Radatz was mentioned in trade rumors with the Los Angeles Dodgers, Milwaukee Braves and Minnesota Twins during the off-season, but eventually returned to the Red Sox. He was 0–2 with a 4.74 ERA before being dealt to the Cleveland Indians on June 2 for Don McMahon and Lee Stange.

Overall with Boston, Radatz saved 104 games (a team record later broken by Bob Stanley) with a 49–34 record and 646 strikeouts in 576.1 innings pitched. With the other four teams, he went only 6–20 with 26 saves in 117.2 innings.

Cleveland Indians
Radatz went 0–3 with a 4.61 ERA in Cleveland. He earned a combined 14 saves between his two teams in 1966, marking the first time in his career he failed to reach 20. He also failed to win a game as he ended the season with an 0–5 record.

Chicago Cubs
Nine games into the 1967 season, Radatz was dealt to the Chicago Cubs for a player to be named later. On June 9, Radatz pitched a scoreless ninth inning against the New York Mets at Wrigley Field to earn his first career win since September 14, 1965. But in 21.2 innings pitched with the Cubs through July 7, Radatz surrendered 12 hits, 23 walks and hit five batters. He was sent down to the minors to work on his control, but was unable to regain it. In 34 innings pitched in the minors, Radatz surrendered 25 hits and 40 walks and hit eight batters.

Detroit Tigers
The Cubs released Radatz during spring training of 1968. He signed with his hometown Detroit Tigers shortly afterwards, and spent the 1968 season with their Triple A affiliate Toledo Mud Hens. With Toledo, Dick was 6–7, 2.78 ERA, 24 GP, started 13 games, 5 CG, 3 SHO, 110.O IP, 103 K, 23 BB, and a WHIP of 0.973. He earned a spot on the major league roster out of spring training 1969, and was 2–2 with a 3.32 ERA in 11 appearances when his contract was sold to the Montreal Expos at the June 15 trade deadline. He went 0–4 with a 5.71 ERA for the Expos before he was released in August.

Later life
After leaving the game, Radatz worked at a number of jobs, had his own weekly radio show, and was a frequent guest on other sports talk radio shows.  Radatz frequently suggested that contemporary relievers weren't durable enough and that his own experience was that when he didn't get used as much, he lost his edge. A resident of Farmington Hills, Michigan, Radatz moved back to the Greater Boston area in 1984, living in Easton, Massachusetts, where former teammate Jerry Moses had found him a job at a corrugated packaging company, Triple P Packaging.  "I felt I had formed a love affair with this town, that I was appreciated by the fans here."  Before his death in 2005, Radatz worked as pitching coach for the North Shore Spirit, an independent league team based in Lynn, Massachusetts. The team was managed by former Red Sox infielder John Kennedy who was expecting Radatz to return for the 2005 season.

Radatz died on March 16, 2005, after falling down a flight of stairs at his home in Easton, Massachusetts. He left behind a wife and three children. The Red Sox held a moment of silence during their 2005 home opener in his honor.

See also

List of Major League Baseball annual saves leaders

References

External links

Dick Radatz at SABR (Baseball BioProject)
Dick Radatz  at The Deadball Era

1937 births
2005 deaths
Accidental deaths from falls
Accidental deaths in Massachusetts
American expatriate baseball players in Canada
American League All-Stars
Baseball players from Detroit
Boston Red Sox players
Chicago Cubs players
Cleveland Indians players
Detroit Tigers players
Major League Baseball pitchers
Michigan State Spartans baseball players
Minneapolis Millers (baseball) players
Montreal Expos players
Raleigh Capitals players
Seattle Rainiers players
Tacoma Cubs players
Toledo Mud Hens players